St David's Church, Connah's Quay is in the town of Connah's Quay, Flintshire, Wales .  It is an active Anglican church in the Deanery of Hawarden, the archdeaconry of Wrexham and the diocese of St Asaph. The Church is the daughter Church of St Mark's Church, Connah's Quay.

History

The Church was built in 1914. The foundation stone was laid on 21 March 1914. The first service was held in the Church in January 1915. The building was initially intended to be the Church Hall and the main Church building was to be built in front on the field. However the parish ran out of money and the hall, which was built of Ellesmere Sandstone with the inside lined with Ruabon brick, was converted into the church and a small hall built next to it, which is now known as the Institute. The field is used for Church Fetes and other events.

Fittings and furniture
The Church was re-vamped in 2004, for the ninetieth anniversary and to bring it up to code regarding health and safety regulations. A new nave altar was installed and the steps inside altered so that they are smaller. Communion is now taken at the nave altar on Sunday mornings and at the High Altar on Wednesday mornings. In 2007 the Church upgraded the seating and now boasts over 100 comfortable chairs for the congregation.

Services

The Church holds a Family Eucharist and Sunday School every Sunday morning at 9.30am and a Holy Eucharist at 10.am on Wednesdays. The new Vicar for Connah's Quay, the Rev Alexier Mayes, was licensed in April 2018.

Gallery

References

External links

Church in Wales church buildings
Churches in Flintshire
Churches completed in 1914